Meral is a common Turkish given name and Altai name. It is a variant of Maral. In Altai, Turkish and Mongolian "Maral" means "female deer". Meral has the same meaning as "Maral". It is also used as a surname.

People

Given name
 Meral Akşener (born 1956), Turkish politician
 Meral Yıldız Ali (born 1987), Romanian-Turkish table tennis player
 Meral Çetinkaya (born 1945), Turkish actress
 Meral Danış Beştaş (born 1967), Turkish politician
 Meral Ece (born 1953), British politician
 Meral Menderes (1933–2011), Turkish opera singer as soprano
 Meral Okay (1959–2012), Turkish actress, film producer and screenwriter
 Meral Özsoyoglu, Turkish-American computer scientist 
 Meral Perin (born 1965), Turkish-German actress
 Meral Tasbas (born 1979), Swedish actress

Surname
 Ziya Meral, Turkish-British researcher and advisor

Turkish feminine given names
Turkish-language surnames